Castro de Rei, is a municipality in the Spanish province of Lugo. It is located in the autonomous community of Galicia and belongs to the region of the Terra Chá. The population in 2009 was 5,685 people according to INE.

Demography
From a demographic standpoint, the whole region suffered the ravages of migration and demographic ageing, which also left indelible consequences in mountain parishes. However, Castro de Rei did not experience these fluctuations in other municipalities in Lugo. Throughout the century the population stood at about six or seven thousand, making the effective population loss not as alarming as in the mountain municipalities of Lugo. Castro de Rei has 25 civil parishes.  It has a population density of 32.7 inhabitants/km2.

Geography
Castro de Rei is located in the comarca of the Terra Cha. This factor determines the most of their socioeconomic characteristics. Its average altitude is between 400 and 500 meters. In the east the terrain becomes more rugged due to its proximity to the eastern mountains. The elevation of the Montes dos Millares is 620 meters and the Pedras Albas has an elevation of 619 meters Pedras Albas. The Minho river and several of its tributaries irrigate the lands. The Minho runs through the municipality and derives secondary manifolds, which are Azúmara, the Lea, and Anllo. Climatically, Castro de Rei has a temperate climate with abundant rainfall in the winter months. The region is characterized by its plains and its vast wetlands, home to waterfowl and large communities of amphibians. Associated with these wetlands appears a landscape mosaic, ecologically rich with color and an ample variety of habitats: grasslands, crops, forests, heath and rushes. The functional organization of the territory follows a monocentric structure with three main comarcs: Vilalba, Guitiriz and Castro de Rei. Castro de Rei has three mountain ranges:
 Os Arroxos 
 O Condado 
 Aguceira 
 Abroiti 
 Pedras Albas

Civil parishes
 Ansemar (San Salvador) 
 Azúmara (San Xoán) 
 Balmonte (San Salvador) 
 Bazar (San Pedro) 
 Bendia (San Pedro) 
 Castro de Rei (San Xoán) 
 Coea (San Salvador) 
 Duancos (Santa María)
 Duarría(Santiago)
 Dumpín(Santalla)
 Goberno (San Martiño) 
 Loentia (Santo Estevo)

Municipalities in the Province of Lugo